Vaishali Thakkar (born 25 July 1964) is an Indian theatre and television actress. She is best known for portraying the comic role of Praveena in the popular show Star Plus TV series Baa Bahoo Aur Baby and portraying the supporting role of Damini in the popular show Colors TV TV series Uttaran. From November 2021, She is currently seen in Star Plus television series Saath Nibhaana Saathiya 2 as Kusum - Gehna’s and Swara’s Mother,.

Biography
Vaishali Thakkar was born in Mumbai. Her father worked in Gujarati theatre, and she first appeared in Gujarati plays. She had a role in the TV series Ek Mahal Ho Sapno Ka, and then in  Baa Bahoo Aur Baby where she played Praveena. She subsequently appeared as Damini Ragendra Bharti in the colors series Uttaran. However, her character was killed midway through the series much to the disappointment of the audience, as the producers claimed her character had not "developed" the way they wanted it to.

Thakkar is fluent in English, Hindi, and Gujarati.

Filmography

References

External links

 
 
 

Living people
Gujarati people
Actresses from Mumbai
20th-century Indian actresses
21st-century Indian actresses
Indian stage actresses
Indian television actresses
Indian soap opera actresses
Actresses in Hindi cinema
Actresses in Hindi television
1964 births